Zinfandel (formerly, Bell Station and Pine Station) is a small unincorporated community in Napa County, California just south of the city of St. Helena in the North Bay region of the San Francisco Bay Area. It is part of the Wine Country. It is located at the intersection of the St. Helena Highway (State Route 29) and Zinfandel Lane and comprises about 14 square blocks, most of which are rural and residential in character. The ZIP Code is 94567. The community is inside area code 707.
 
The town was named after a grape and a variety of wine produced from that grape.

History
The place was first called Pine Station, and later as Bell Station, before bearing its present name.

Economy
Boisset Collection is based in Zinfandel.

Government

References

External links
Google maps

Unincorporated communities in Napa County, California
Napa Valley
Unincorporated communities in California